Chiara De Bortoli (born 28 July 1997 in Venice) is an Italian volleyball player.
She plays for the Italy women's national volleyball team.

Career 
Chiara De Bortoli's career begins in the 2012–13 season when she joined the AGS Volley San Donà, in the B1 league, a club which she remains tied for three seasons; during this period he is part of the Italian youth teams, 
She won a bronze medal at the 2015 FIVB Volleyball Women's U20 World Championship.

In the 2015–16 season, she played for Conegliano's Imoco Volley.
In the 2016, she became part of the Italy national team. She participated in the 2017 FIVB Volleyball World Grand Prix.

References

External links 
 Player profile, CEV
 Player profile, FIVB
 Player profile legavolleyfemminile.it
 
 

1997 births
Living people
Italian women's volleyball players
Sportspeople from Venice
Universiade medalists in volleyball
Universiade silver medalists for Italy
Medalists at the 2019 Summer Universiade